The ACAE/AECC CJ-1000A (Chang Jiang-1000A/长江-1000A) is a Chinese high-bypass turbofan jet engine currently in development by the Aero Engine Corporation of China (AECC) under its Commercial Aircraft Engines (ACAE) Shanghai division.

Design 

It uses a similar two-spool configuration, with a one-stage fan, three-stage booster, 10-stage high-pressure compressor, two-stage high-pressure turbine and six-stage low pressure turbine, compared to the LEAP-1C seven  stages.
Its 18 wide-chord fan blades are made of hollow titanium like those of Rolls-Royce Plc., and its single annular combustor uses 3D printed fuel nozzles.

Development 
A model of the CJ-1000Al was exhibited at the AVIC booth of the September 2011 Beijing Air Show, and was expected to be completed in 2016.
At the time, entry into service was targeted for 2020 and a possible cooperation with MTU Aero Engines was studied.
In 2013, AVIC Engine subsidiary Shenyang Aeroengine Research Institute proposed its  WS-20 (SF-A) (designed for the Y-20 military airlifter), which was still being developed, to power the C919 instead of the CJ-1000A (SF-B) which used older technology closer to the CFM56 than to the LEAP. The suggestion was rejected later by Comac.
Assembly of the first CJ-1000AX engine was completed in December 2017 after an 18-month process. Twenty-four more engines will support an airworthiness certification program and it should enter service after 2021.
In May 2018, the first engine ran in a Shanghai test cell reaching a core speed of 6,600 rpm.

By May 2018, AECC intended to certify its CJ-1000 in 2027 and introduce it in 2030, eight years behind the original schedule, due to the decision to fully indigenously produce all parts.
The CJ-1000A would need  thrust to replace the CFM LEAP. The  CJ-1000B would power an extended-range C919 variant.

Other derivatives

CJ-2000 (AEF3500)
The CJ-1000  spool and combustor core, with 10 compressor stages and two turbine stages, will be scaled up for the  CJ-2000 for a 2023 demonstration.
It will need a new low-pressure spool with a four-stage  compressor booster up from three, and seven LP turbine stages up from six, the GEnx-1B stage count while the UEC PD-35 has nine HP compressor stages.

CJ-500
The CJ-500 would offer  for the Comac ARJ21.

Applications
 Comac C919: as alternative to CFM LEAP

Specifications

See also

References

2010s turbofan engines
High-bypass turbofan engines